Sir Ian Lloyd McKay  (7 March 1929 – 20 February 2014) was a Judge of the Court of Appeal of New Zealand from 1991 to 1997. He became a member of the Privy Council of the United Kingdom in 1992, and was president of the Electoral Commission from 1997 to 2000. In the 1998 Queen's Birthday Honours, he was appointed a Knight Companion of the New Zealand Order of Merit, for services as a judge of the Court of Appeal and to the law.

McKay died on 20 February 2014 in Wellington.

References

1929 births
2014 deaths
People from Waipawa
20th-century New Zealand judges
Court of Appeal of New Zealand judges
New Zealand members of the Privy Council of the United Kingdom
Knights Companion of the New Zealand Order of Merit